The Leica MP is a 35 mm film camera manufactured by Leica Camera AG that was introduced in 2003. It is an all-mechanical rangefinder focusing camera that follows in a long line of cameras since the Leica M3 was introduced in 1954. The camera uses the Leica M-mount, which accepts all Leica bayonet-mount lenses (21 mm through 135 mm) made since 1954.  The 'MP' designation stands for "mechanical perfection."

Design
Unlike the preceding Leica M7, the camera has adopted many retro design features from the earlier M3. These include a M3 type metal film advance lever, knob film rewind design and M3 type frameline adjust lever. The basic classic design remains unchanged and the design for loading film from the bottom has been retained. The camera comes in various camera finishes including black chrome, black paint and silver chrome and can be further customised with Leica AG's à la carte program.

Features
Features include an integrated silicon photodiode TTL lightmeter that works from EV-2 to EV20. Only the lightmeter requires batteries to operate; the rest of the camera is fully mechanical, unlike the M7, and will operate without electricity. The camera's viewfinder is available with different magnifications of 0.58x, 0.72x and 0.85x and is improved to reduce flaring with multicoated glass elements and a condenser lens. The camera is also compatible with Leica Motor-M, Winder-M, Winder 4-P and Winder 4-2 motorised film winders and the Leicavit manual winder.

References

External links
  Leica MP Technical Data
 Leica Camera AG website, Leica MP
 Leica M enthusiast forum

Leica rangefinder cameras
MP

de:Leica MP